EgyptSat-A or MisrSat A is Egypt's third Earth observation satellite following the EgyptSat 1 launched in 2007 and EgyptSat 2 launched in 2014. This satellite was built by the Egyptian National Authority for Remote Sensing and Space Sciences Jointly with Russian RKK Energia while the imaging payload was developed by OAO Peleng and NIRUP Geoinformatsionnye Sistemy in Belarus.

See also 

 EgyptSat 1
 EgyptSat 2

References 

Earth imaging satellites
Spacecraft launched in 2019
Satellites of Egypt
2019 in Egypt